The 1974 Canadian Indoor Championships was a men's tennis tournament played on indoor hard courts that was part of the 1974 USLTA Indoor Circuit and took place at the Glenmore Racquet Club in Calgary, Alberta in Canada. It was the second and last edition of the tournament and was held from 12 March through 17 March 1974. Third-seeded Karl Meiler won the singles title which earned him $4,000 first-prize money.

Finals

Singles
 Karl Meiler defeated  Byron Bertram 6–4, 3–6, 6–3
 It was Meiler's 2nd and last singles title of the year and the 2nd of his career.

Doubles
 Jürgen Fassbender /  Karl Meiler defeated  Iván Molina /  Jairo Velasco, Sr. 6–4, 6–4

Notes

References

External links
 ATP tournament profile
 ITF tournament edition details

Canadian Indoor Championships
Canadian Indoor Championships